Berowra railway station is located on the Main Northern line, serving the Sydney suburb of Berowra. It is served by Sydney Trains T1 North Shore Line services and NSW TrainLink Central Coast & Newcastle Line services.

History

Berowra station opened on 7 April 1887 when the Main Northern line was extended from Hornsby to Hawkesbury River. In 1909, the line was duplicated and the present island platform built.

On 23 October 1983, a passing loop was opened opposite the platform. This allowed suburban services to terminate, and from January 1992, Berowra became the northern boundary of the Sydney suburban network replacing Cowan.

On 28 August 2006, Platform 3 opened on the passing loop as part of the Rail Clearways Program, to allow suburban trains to terminate clear of the running lines. Trains now terminate on the middle Platform 2, allowing through trains to overtake any terminating trains standing in the station. The upgrade also included provision of lifts, a new over-rail bridge for general station access and additional wet weather protection.

On 22 January 2007, Berowra station was almost engulfed as bushfires swept the Ku-ring-gai Chase National Park. Efforts from firefighters saved the station and a train which had terminated there.

Platforms and services

Transport links
Transdev NSW operate three routes via Berowra station:
592: Hornsby station to Mooney Mooney
597: to Hornsby station, or the Mt Ku-ring-gai industrial estate (Beaumont road)
599: to Berowra Heights

Trackplan

References

External links

Berowra station details Transport for New South Wales

Easy Access railway stations in Sydney
Railway stations in Sydney
Railway stations in Australia opened in 1887
Hornsby Shire
Main North railway line, New South Wales